

Box office collection
The top films released in 2016 by worldwide box office gross revenue are as follows:

This is a list of Telugu language films released in the year 2016. The list contains only those movies that are made in Telugu language.

January 2016 – June 2016

July 2016 – December 2016

Dubbed films

References

2016
Telugu
Telugu